Large, Medium-Speed Roll-on/Roll-off (LMSR) refers to several classes of Military Sealift Command (MSC) roll-on/roll-off type cargo ships. Some are purpose-built for military cargo, while others were converted.

Bob Hope Class

The Bob Hope class are a group of seven Diesel powered vessels built at Avondale Shipyard in Louisiana between 1993 and 2001 for MSC.

Watson Class

The Watson class are a group of eight Gas Turbine powered vessels built at National Steel and Shipbuilding Company (NASSCO) in San Diego, California between 1996 and 2002 for MSC.

Gordon Class

The Gordon class are group of two LMSR's. Gordon was built in Denmark in 1972 as MV Jutlandia, and entered commercial service on 1 June 1973. After some time spent in commercial service she was lengthened by Hyundai Heavy Industries in 1984, and later went on to be acquired by the US Navy under a long term charter. She was converted for the Navy at Newport News Shipbuilding and Drydock Company and on delivery to the Navy was assigned to the Military Sealift Command on 23 August 1996 under the name USNS Gordon.

Shughart Class

The Shughart class are group of three LMSR's. Shughart was built as the Laura Maersk in 1980 in Denmark by Lindovaerftet for A. P. Moller-Maersk Group (Maersk). She was lengthened in 1987 and again in the early 1990s by Hyundai. On May 7, 1996 Laura Maersk was delivered to Military Sealift Command and was outfitted at NASSCO.

 
 
  (ex-USNS Soderman (T-AKR-299))

References

+
 Cargo ships